Alexandre "Álex" Corredera Alardi (born 19 March 1996) is a Spanish footballer who plays for CD Tenerife  as an attacking midfielder.

Club career
Born in Vic, Barcelona, Catalonia, Corredera joined FC Barcelona's youth setup in 2004 at the age of eight. On 1 July 2015, he signed a two-year deal with Deportivo de La Coruña, being initially assigned to the reserves in the Tercera División.

Corredera made his senior debut on 23 August 2015, starting in a 1–0 Tercera División away win against CD Boiro. Seven days later he scored his first goal, netting the first in a 2–2 home draw against Arosa SC.

On 9 July 2017, free agent Corredera moved to another reserve team, UD Almería B also in the fourth level. On 24 September, he scored a hat-trick in a 4–0 home routing of Villacarrillo CF.

Corredera made his first-team debut on 22 October 2017, coming on as a substitute for Nauzet Alemán in a 0–1 home loss against CF Reus Deportiu in the Segunda División. The following 3 July, he joined Real Murcia in Segunda División B.

On 16 January 2019, Corredera moved to Valencia CF Mestalla of the third division, after terminating his contract with Murcia. On 18 July 2019, he signed for CD Badajoz in the same category.

On 2 June 2021, after scoring a career-best 10 goals in the 2020–21 season, Corredera signed a three-year contract with CD Tenerife of the second division. On his club debut on 15 August, he scored a last-minute winner in a 2–1 away win over CF Fuenlabrada; it was also his first professional goal.

Honours
Barcelona
UEFA Youth League: 2013–14

References

External links

1996 births
Living people
Spanish footballers
Footballers from Vic
Association football midfielders
Segunda División players
Segunda División B players
Tercera División players
Deportivo Fabril players
UD Almería B players
UD Almería players
Real Murcia players
Valencia CF Mestalla footballers
CD Badajoz players
CD Tenerife players